Druzhnaya may refer to:

 Druzhnaya, Bryansk Oblast, a rural locality in Navlinsky District, Bryansk Oblast, Russia
 Druzhnaya, Perm Krai, a rural locality in Bryukhovskoye Rural Settlement, Yelovsky District, Perm Krai, Russia
 Druzhnaya, Vladimir Oblast, a rural locality in Styopantsevskoye Rural Settlement, Vyaznikovsky District, Vladimir Oblast, Russia

See also 
 Druzhnaya Gorka
 Druzhny (disambiguation)
 Druzhnoye